1231 Auricula is a carbonaceous background asteroid from the central regions of the asteroid belt, approximately  in diameter. It was discovered on 10 October 1931, by German astronomer Karl Reinmuth at the Heidelberg Observatory. The likely elongated C-type asteroid has a rotation period of 3.98 hours. It was named after the flowering plant auricula and indirectly honors astronomer Gustav Stracke.

Orbit and classification 

Based on recent HCM-analyses, Auricula is a non-family asteroid that belongs to the main belt's background population. On its osculating Keplerian orbital elements, it is located in the Eunomia region, where the prominent family of stony asteroids is located.

It orbits the Sun in the central main-belt at a distance of 2.4–2.9 AU once every 4 years and 4 months (1,593 days; semi-major axis of 2.67 AU). Its orbit has an eccentricity of 0.09 and an inclination of 11° with respect to the ecliptic. The body's observation arc begins with its official discovery observation at Heidelberg in October 1931.

Naming 

This minor planet was named after the yellow flowered Alpine primrose, primula auricula. The official  was mentioned in The Names of the Minor Planets by Paul Herget in 1955. It honors German astronomer and diligent orbit computer Gustav Stracke (1887–1943), who had asked that no asteroid be named after him. The initials of the asteroids  through (1234), all discovered by Karl Reinmuth, spell out "G. Stracke". In this manner, Reinmuth was able to circumvent Stracke's desire and honor him nevertheless. The asteroid 1019 Strackea was later named after Stracke directly. The consecutive initial letters of these minor-planet names spell out "MarsdenB".

Reinmuth's flowers 

Due to his many discoveries, Karl Reinmuth submitted a large list of 66 newly named asteroids in the early 1930s. This list also contained a sequence of 28 asteroids, starting with 1054 Forsytia, that were all named after plants, in particular flowering plants (also see list of minor planets named after animals and plants).

Physical characteristics 

In the SDSS-based taxonomy, Auricula is a common, carbonaceous C-type asteroid.

Rotation period and poles 

In April 2008, a rotational lightcurve of Auricula was obtained from photometric observations by Colin Bembrick at the Mount Tarana Observatory  and other observers from Australia and New Zealand. Lightcurve analysis gave a rotation period of  hours with a brightness amplitude of 0.75 magnitude, indicative of a non-spherical, elongated shape. A modeled lightcurve using photometric data from the Lowell Photometric Database was published in 2016. It gave a concurring sidereal period of  hours, as well as two spin axes at (57.0°, −57.0°) and (225.0°, −85.0°) in ecliptic coordinates (λ, β).

Diameter and albedo 

According to the surveys carried out by the Infrared Astronomical Satellite IRAS, the Japanese Akari satellite and the NEOWISE mission of NASA's Wide-field Infrared Survey Explorer, Auricula measures between 13.43 and 22.52 kilometers in diameter and its surface has an albedo between 0.066 and 0.11. The Collaborative Asteroid Lightcurve Link derives an albedo of 0.0465 and a diameter of 22.37 kilometers based on an absolute magnitude of 12.2.

References

External links 
 Lightcurve Database Query (LCDB), at www.minorplanet.info
 Dictionary of Minor Planet Names, Google books
 Discovery Circumstances: Numbered Minor Planets (1)-(5000) – Minor Planet Center
 
 

001231
Discoveries by Karl Wilhelm Reinmuth
Named minor planets
19311010